Honnorat is a French surname. Notable people with the surname include:

 André Honnorat (1868–1950), French politician
  (1783–1852), French doctor, natural scientist, and linguist

French-language surnames